The Gospel of Matthew is the first book of the New Testament of the Bible and one of the three synoptic Gospels. It tells how Israel's Messiah, Jesus, comes to his people (the Jews) but is rejected by them and how, after his resurrection, he sends the disciples to the gentiles instead. Matthew wishes to emphasize that the Jewish tradition should not be lost in a church that was increasingly becoming gentile. The gospel reflects the struggles and conflicts between the evangelist's community and the other Jews, particularly with its sharp criticism of the scribes and Pharisees with the position that through their rejection of Christ, the Kingdom of God has been taken away from them and given instead to the church. 

Traditionally, the gospel has been attributed to the Apostle Matthew, who is described as a tax collector within the text. Most modern scholars hold the gospel was written anonymously by a male Jew in the last quarter of the first century who was familiar with technical legal aspects of scripture. The authorship has been variously dated between AD 40 and AD 85, with most modern scholars favoring the latter date of AD 85. A minority of scholars hold to a pre-70 date.

Composition

Author and date

According to early church tradition, which among extant literature is first attested by Papias of Hierapolis (c. AD 60–130), Matthew (died c. AD 60-70) wrote down the sayings of the Lord in his native tongue and composed the gospel for the Jews of Judea during his lifetime. 

Most modern scholars hold the gospel was written anonymously in the last quarter of the first century by a male Jew who stood on the margin between traditional and non-traditional Jewish values, and was familiar with technical legal aspects of scripture being debated in his time The majority believe that Mark was the first gospel to be composed and that Matthew and Luke both drew upon it as a major source for their works. 

According to this view, the author did not simply copy Mark, but used it as a base, emphasizing Jesus's place in the Jewish tradition and including details not found in Mark. Writing in a polished Semitic "synagogue Greek", he drew on the Gospel of Mark as a source, plus a hypothetical collection of sayings known as the Q source (material shared with Luke but not with Mark) and hypothetical material unique to his own community, called the M source or "Special Matthew." Matthew has 600 verses in common with Mark, which is a book of only 661 verses. There is approximately an additional 220 verses shared by Matthew and Luke but not found in Mark, from a second source, a hypothetical collection of sayings to which scholars give the name "Quelle" ("source" in the German language), or the Q source. This view, known as the two-source hypothesis (Mark and Q), allows for a further body of tradition known as "Special Matthew", or the M source, meaning material unique to Matthew. This may represent a separate source, or it may come from the author's church, or he may have composed these verses himself. The author also had the Greek scriptures at his disposal, both as book-scrolls (Greek translations of Isaiah, the Psalms etc.) and in the form of "testimony collections" (collections of excerpts), and the oral stories of his community.

Setting 
Church tradition holds that Matthew wrote his gospel in his native language for the Jewish community in Judea before he set out on his missionary journey to the surrounding nations, and that others interpreted them as best they could. Most scholars, on the other hand, view the gospel of Matthew as a work of the second generation of Christians, for whom the defining event was the destruction of Jerusalem and the Temple by the Romans in AD 70 in the course of the First Jewish–Roman War (AD 66–73). From this point on, what had begun with Jesus of Nazareth as a Jewish messianic movement became an increasingly gentile phenomenon evolving in time into a separate religion. They hold that the author wrote for a community of Greek-speaking Jewish Christians located probably in Syria. Antioch, the largest city in Roman Syria and the third largest city in the empire, is often proposed. 

The community to which Matthew belonged, like many 1st-century Christians, was still part of the larger Jewish community. The relationship of Matthew to this wider world of Judaism remains a subject of study and contention, the principal question being to what extent, if any, Matthew's community had cut itself off from its Jewish roots. It is evident from the gospel that there was conflict between Matthew's group and other Jewish groups, and it is generally agreed that the root of the conflict was the Matthew community's belief in Jesus as the Messiah and authoritative interpreter of the law, as one risen from the dead and uniquely endowed with divine authority.

The divine nature of Jesus was a major issue for the Matthaean community, the crucial element separating the early Christians from their Jewish neighbors; while Mark begins with Jesus's baptism and temptations, Matthew goes back to Jesus's origins, showing him as the Son of God from his birth, the fulfillment of messianic prophecies of the Old Testament. The title Son of David, used exclusively in relation to miracles, identifies Jesus as the healing and miracle-working Messiah of Israel sent to Israel alone. As Son of Man he will return to judge the world, an expectation which his disciples recognize but of which his enemies are unaware. As Son of God, God is revealing himself through his son, and Jesus proving his sonship through his obedience and example.

Unlike Mark, Matthew never bothers to explain Jewish customs, since his intended audience was a Jewish one; unlike Luke, who traces Jesus's ancestry back to Adam, father of the human race, he traces it only to Abraham, father of the Jews. Of his three presumed sources only "M", the material from his own community, refers to a "church" (ecclesia), an organized group with rules for keeping order; and the content of "M" suggests that this community was strict in keeping the Jewish law, holding that they must exceed the scribes and the Pharisees in "righteousness" (adherence to Jewish law). Writing from within a Jewish-Christian community growing increasingly distant from other Jews and becoming increasingly gentile in its membership and outlook, Matthew put down in his gospel his vision "of an assembly or church in which both Jew and Gentile would flourish together".

Structure and content

Structure: narrative and discourses
Matthew, alone among the gospels, alternates five blocks of narrative with five of discourse, marking each off with the phrase "When Jesus had finished" (see Five Discourses of Matthew). Some scholars see in this a deliberate plan to create a parallel to the first five books of the Old Testament; others see a three-part structure based around the idea of Jesus as Messiah, a set of weekly readings spread out over the year, or no plan at all. Davies and Allison, in their widely used commentary, draw attention to the use of "triads" (the gospel groups things in threes), and R. T. France, in another influential commentary, notes the geographic movement from Galilee to Jerusalem and back, with the post-resurrection appearances in Galilee as the culmination of the whole story.

Prologue: genealogy, Nativity and infancy (Matt. 1–2) 

The Gospel of Matthew begins with the words "The Book of Genealogy [in Greek, "Genesis"] of Jesus Christ", deliberately echoing the words of Genesis 2:4 in the Old Testament in Greek. The genealogy tells of Jesus's descent from Abraham and King David and the miraculous events surrounding his virgin birth, and the infancy narrative tells of the massacre of the innocents, the flight into Egypt, and eventual journey to Nazareth.

First narrative and Sermon on the Mount (Matt. 3:1–8:1)

The first narrative section begins. John the Baptist baptizes Jesus, and the Holy Spirit descends upon him. Jesus prays and meditates in the wilderness for forty days, and is tempted by Satan. His early ministry by word and deed in Galilee meets with much success, and leads to the Sermon on the Mount, the first of the discourses. The sermon presents the ethics of the kingdom of God, introduced by the Beatitudes ("Blessed are..."). It concludes with a reminder that the response to the kingdom will have eternal consequences, and the crowd's amazed response leads into the next narrative block.

Second narrative and discourse (Matt. 8:2–11:1)
From the authoritative words of Jesus, the gospel turns to three sets of three miracles interwoven with two sets of two discipleship stories (the second narrative), followed by a discourse on mission and suffering. Jesus commissions the Twelve Disciples and sends them to preach to the Jews, perform miracles, and prophesy the imminent coming of the Kingdom, commanding them to travel lightly, without staff or sandals.

Third narrative and discourse (Matt. 11:2–13:53)
Opposition to Jesus comes to a head with accusations that his deeds are done through the power of Satan. Jesus in turn accuses his opponents of blaspheming the Holy Spirit. The discourse is a set of parables emphasizing the sovereignty of God, and concluding with a challenge to the disciples to understand the teachings as scribes of the Kingdom of Heaven. (Matthew avoids using the holy word God in the expression "Kingdom of God"; instead he prefers the term "Kingdom of Heaven", reflecting the Jewish tradition of not speaking the name of God).

Fourth narrative and discourse (Matt. 13:54–19:1)

The fourth narrative section reveals that the increasing opposition to Jesus will result in his crucifixion in Jerusalem, and that his disciples must therefore prepare for his absence. The instructions for the post-crucifixion church emphasize responsibility and humility. This section contains the two feedings of the multitude (Matthew 14:13–21 and 15:32–39) along with the narrative in which Simon, newly renamed Peter (Πέτρος, Petros, meaning "stone"), calls Jesus "the Christ, the son of the living God", and Jesus states that on this "bedrock" (πέτρα, petra) he will build his church (Matthew 16:13–19). 

Matthew 16:13–19 forms the foundation for the papacy's claim of authority.

Fifth narrative and discourse (Matt. 19:2–26:1)

Jesus travels toward Jerusalem, and the opposition intensifies: he is tested by Pharisees as soon as he begins to move toward the city, and when he arrives he is soon in conflict with the Temple's traders and religious leaders. He teaches in the Temple, debating with the chief priests and religious leaders and speaking in parables about the Kingdom of God and the failings of the chief priests and the Pharisees. The Herodian caucus also become involved in a scheme to entangle Jesus, but Jesus's careful response to their enquiry, "Render therefore to Caesar the things that are Caesar's, and to God the things that are God's", leaves them marveling at his words.

The disciples ask about the future, and in his final discourse (the Olivet Discourse) Jesus speaks of the coming end. There will be false Messiahs, earthquakes, and persecutions, the sun, moon, and stars will fail, but "this generation" will not pass away before all the prophecies are fulfilled. The disciples must steel themselves for ministry to all the nations. At the end of the discourse, Matthew notes that Jesus has finished all his words, and attention turns to the crucifixion.

Conclusion: Passion, Resurrection and Great Commission (Matt. 26:2–28:20)
The events of Jesus's last week occupy a third of the content of all four gospels. Jesus enters Jerusalem in triumph and drives the money changers from the Temple, holds a last supper, prays to be spared the coming agony (but concludes "if this cup may not pass away from me, except I drink it, thy will be done"), and is betrayed. He is tried by the Jewish leaders (the Sanhedrin) and before Pontius Pilate, and Pilate washes his hands to indicate that he does not assume responsibility. Jesus is crucified as king of the Jews, mocked by all. On his death there is an earthquake, the veil of the Temple is rent, and saints rise from their tombs. Mary Magdalene and another Mary discover the empty tomb, guarded by an angel, and Jesus himself tells them to tell the disciples to meet him in Galilee.

After the resurrection the remaining disciples return to Galilee, "to the mountain that Jesus had appointed", where he comes to them and tells them that he has been given "all authority in heaven and on Earth." He gives the Great Commission: "Therefore go and make disciples of all the nations, baptizing them in the name of the Father and of the Son and of the Holy Spirit, teaching them to obey everything that I have commanded you". Jesus will be with them "to the very end of the age".

Theology

Christology 
Christology is the theological doctrine of Christ, "the affirmations and definitions of Christ's humanity and deity". There are a variety of Christologies in the New Testament, albeit with a single centre—Jesus is the figure in whom God has acted for mankind's salvation.

Matthew has taken over his key Christological texts from Mark, but sometimes he has changed the stories he found in Mark, giving evidence of his own concerns. The title Son of David identifies Jesus as the healing and miracle-working Messiah of Israel (it is used exclusively in relation to miracles), and the Jewish messiah is sent to Israel alone. As Son of Man he will return to judge the world, a fact his disciples recognise but of which his enemies are unaware. As Son of God he is named Immanuel (God with us), God revealing himself through his son, and Jesus proving his sonship through his obedience and example.

Relationship with the Jews 
Matthew's prime concern was that the Jewish tradition should not be lost in a church that was increasingly becoming gentile. This concern lies behind the frequent citations of Jewish scripture, the evocation of Jesus as the new Moses along with other events from Jewish history, and the concern to present Jesus as fulfilling, not destroying, the Law. Matthew must have been aware of the tendency to distort Paul's teaching of the law no longer having power over the New Testament Christian into antinomianism, and addressed Christ's fulfilling of what the Israelites expected from the "Law and the Prophets" in an eschatological sense, in that he was all that the Old Testament had predicted in the Messiah.

The gospel has been interpreted as reflecting the struggles and conflicts between the evangelist's community and the other Jews, particularly with its sharp criticism of the scribes and Pharisees. It tells how Israel's Messiah, rejected and executed in Israel, pronounces judgment on Israel and its leaders and becomes the salvation of the gentiles. Prior to the crucifixion of Jesus, the Jews are referred to as Israelites—the honorific title of God's chosen people. After it, they are called Ioudaios(Jews), a sign that—due to their rejection of the Christ—the "Kingdom of Heaven" has been taken away from them and given instead to the church.

Comparison with other writings

Christological development 
The divine nature of Jesus was a major issue for the community of Matthew, the crucial element marking them from their Jewish neighbors. Early understandings of this nature grew as the gospels were being written. Before the gospels, that understanding was focused on the revelation of Jesus as God in his resurrection, but the gospels reflect a broadened focus extended backwards in time.

Mark
Matthew is a creative reinterpretation of Mark, stressing Jesus's teachings as much as his acts, and making subtle changes in order to stress his divine nature: for example, Mark's "young man" who appears at Jesus's tomb becomes "a radiant angel" in Matthew. The miracle stories in Mark do not demonstrate the divinity of Jesus, but rather confirm his status as an emissary of God (which was Mark's understanding of the Messiah).

Chronology 
There is a broad disagreement over chronology between Matthew, Mark and Luke on one hand and John on the other: all four agree that Jesus's public ministry began with an encounter with John the Baptist, but Matthew, Mark and Luke follow this with an account of teaching and healing in Galilee, then a trip to Jerusalem where there is an incident in the Temple, climaxing with the crucifixion on the day of the Passover holiday. John, by contrast, puts the Temple incident very early in Jesus's ministry, has several trips to Jerusalem, and puts the crucifixion immediately before the Passover holiday, on the day when the lambs for the Passover meal were being sacrificed in Temple.

Canonical positioning
The early patristic scholars regarded Matthew as the earliest of the gospels and placed it first in the canon, and the early Church mostly quoted from Matthew, secondarily from John, and only distantly from Mark.

See also

Notes

References

Citations

Sources 

 
 
 
 
 
 
 
 
 
 
 
 
 
 
 
 
 
 
 
 
 
 
 
 
 
 
 
 
 
 
 
 
 
 
 
 
 
 
 
 
 
 
 
 
 
 
 
 
 
 
 
 
 
 , in 
 
 , in

External links 
 Biblegateway.com (opens at Matt.1:1, NIV)
 A textual commentary on the Gospel of Matthew Detailed text-critical discussion of the 300 most important variants of the Greek text (PDF, 438 pages).
 Early Christian Writings Gospel of Matthew: introductions and e-texts.
  Various versions

 
Matthew
Works of uncertain authorship
Texts in Koine Greek
Synoptic Gospels